X-Men is a 2000 American superhero film directed by Bryan Singer from a screenplay David Hayter, based on the Marvel Comics superhero team of the same name created by Stan Lee and Jack Kirby. The film features an ensemble cast consisting of Patrick Stewart, Hugh Jackman, Ian McKellen, Halle Berry, Famke Janssen, James Marsden, Bruce Davison, Rebecca Romijn, Ray Park, Tyler Mane, and Anna Paquin. The film depicts a world where an unknown proportion of people are mutants, whose possession of superhuman powers makes them distrusted by normal humans. It focuses on mutants Wolverine and Rogue as they are brought into a conflict between two groups that have radically different approaches to bringing about the acceptance of mutant-kind: Charles Xavier's X-Men, and the Brotherhood of Mutants, led by Magneto.

Development of X-Men began as far back as 1984 with Orion Pictures, with James Cameron and Kathryn Bigelow in discussions at one point. The film rights were bought by 20th Century Fox in 1994, and various scripts and film treatments were commissioned from Andrew Kevin Walker, John Logan, Joss Whedon, and Michael Chabon. Singer signed to direct in 1996, with further rewrites by Ed Solomon, Singer, Tom DeSanto, Christopher McQuarrie, and Hayter, in which Beast and Nightcrawler were deleted over budget concerns from Fox. X-Men marked the American debut for Jackman, a last-second choice for Wolverine, cast three weeks into filming. Filming took place from September 22, 1999, to March 3, 2000, primarily in Toronto.

X-Men premiered at Ellis Island on July 12, 2000, and was released in the United States on July 14. It was a box office success, grossing over $296.3million worldwide, and received positive reviews from critics, citing its performances, especially Jackman’s portrayal of Wolverine, story, and thematic depth. The film's success led to a series of sequels, prequels, reboots, and spin-offs, with the overall success of the series helping spawn a reemergence of superhero films.

Plot
In 1944 Nazi-occupied Poland, 13-year-old Erik Lehnsherr is separated from his parents upon entering the Auschwitz concentration camp. While attempting to reach them, he causes a set of metal gates to bend toward him because of his mutant ability to generate magnetic fields, but is knocked out by the guards. In the not-too-distant future, U.S. Senator Robert Kelly attempts to pass a "Mutant Registration Act" in Congress, which would force mutants to reveal their identities and abilities. Present are Lehnsherr, now going by the name "Magneto", and his telepathic colleague Professor Charles Xavier. Xavier sees Lehnsherr in attendance and is concerned with how he will respond to the Registration Act.

In Meridian, Mississippi, 17-year-old Marie accidentally puts her boyfriend into a coma after she kisses him, because of her mutant ability to absorb the power and life force of others. Adopting the name "Rogue", she runs away to Alberta, where she meets Logan, also known as "Wolverine", a mutant who possesses superhuman healing abilities and metal claws that protrude from between his knuckles. They are attacked on the road by Sabretooth, a member of Magneto's Brotherhood of Mutants, but two members of Xavier's X-Men, Cyclops and Storm, arrive and save them. Wolverine and Rogue are brought to Xavier's school for mutants in Westchester County, New York, where Xavier tells Logan that Magneto appears to have taken an interest in him and asks him to stay while he investigates the matter. Rogue enrolls in the school.

Senator Kelly is abducted by Brotherhood members Toad and Mystique and brought to their hideout on the uncharted island of Genosha. Magneto uses Kelly as a test subject for a machine powered by his magnetic abilities that generates a field of radiation, which induces mutations in normal humans. Kelly later escapes by taking advantage of his newfound mutation. Rogue visits Wolverine during the night while he is having a nightmare. Startled, he accidentally stabs her, but she is able to absorb his healing ability to recover. This is observed by fellow students who arrived to help. She is later convinced by Mystique, disguised as Rogue's crush Bobby Drake, that Xavier is angry with her and she should leave the school. Xavier uses his mutant-locating machine Cerebro to find Rogue at a train station, and the X-Men go to retrieve her. Meanwhile, Mystique enters Cerebro and sabotages it.

Having left ahead of Storm and Cyclops, Wolverine finds Rogue on a train and convinces her to return to the school. Before they can leave, Magneto arrives, knocks out Wolverine and subdues Rogue, revealing it was her who he wants rather than Wolverine. Although Xavier attempts to stop him by mentally controlling Sabretooth, he is forced to release his hold when Magneto threatens the police who have converged on the train station, allowing the Brotherhood to escape with Rogue. Kelly arrives at the school, and Xavier reads his mind to learn about Magneto's machine. Realizing the strain of powering it nearly killed him, the X-Men deduce he intends to transfer his powers to Rogue and use her to power it at the cost of her life. Kelly's body rejects his mutation, and his body dissolves into liquid. Xavier attempts to locate Rogue using Cerebro, but Mystique's sabotage incapacitates him, and he falls into a coma. Fellow telekinetic and telepath Jean Grey fixes Cerebro and uses it, learning that the Brotherhood plans to place their mutation-inducing machine on Liberty Island and use it to "mutate" the world leaders meeting at a summit on nearby Ellis Island. The X-Men scale the Statue of Liberty, battling and overpowering the Brotherhood while Magneto transfers his powers to Rogue and activates the mutation machine. As Wolverine confronts and distracts Magneto, Cyclops blasts him away, allowing Wolverine to destroy the machine. He transfers his powers to Rogue, rejuvenating her while incapacitating himself.

Professor Xavier and Wolverine recover from their comas. The group also learns that Mystique escaped the island battle and is impersonating Senator Kelly, despite being seriously injured by Wolverine. Xavier gives Wolverine a lead to his past at an abandoned military installation in Canada. Magneto is imprisoned in a complex constructed of plastic and is visited by Xavier, and Magneto warns him that he intends to escape one day and continue the fight; Xavier replies that he will always be there to stop him.

Cast
 Patrick Stewart as Professor Charles Xavier: The founder of the X-Men and the Xavier School for Gifted Youngsters, who hopes for peaceful coexistence between mutantkind and mankind and is regarded as an authority on genetic mutation. Although restricted to a wheelchair, his mutant powers include vast telepathy, which is amplified by the Cerebro supercomputer that he invented with Magneto's help.
 Hugh Jackman as Logan / Wolverine: A Canadian roughhouser who has lived for fifteen years without any memory of his past, apart from his dog tags and an adamantium-encased skeleton. His powers include enhanced animal-like senses, an accelerated healing factor granting him virtual immortality (which makes his age impossible to determine), and three claws extending past the bridge of each knuckle.
 Ian McKellen as Erik Lehnsherr / Magneto: An Auschwitz survivor who was friends with Xavier until his belief that humans and mutants could never co-exist led to their separation. His powers include the ability to generate powerful magnetic fields and a sophisticated knowledge in matters of genetic manipulation, which he uses to attempt to mutate the world leaders to allow mutant prosperity. 
 Brett Morris as thirteen-year-old Erik Lehnsherr
 Halle Berry as Ororo Munroe / Storm: A Maasai woman who teaches calmly and caringly at Xavier's school but has become bitter with other people's hatred for mutants, sometimes making her hate humans in return simply because she is afraid of them. Her powers include the ability to manipulate the weather and create lightning storms.
 Famke Janssen as Dr. Jean Grey: The medical doctor of the X-Mansion and romantically involved with Cyclops. Her powers include telekinesis and telepathy.
 James Marsden as Scott Summers / Cyclops: Xavier's second-in-command and an instructor at the institute who serves as the X-Men's field leader. He is seeing Jean Grey. His powers include a strong, uncontrollable red beam of optic energy produced from his eyes, which is only held in check by sunglasses or a specialized ruby-quartz visor enabling him to control the strength of the beam to fire when in combat.
 Bruce Davison as Senator Robert Kelly: An anti-mutant politician who is in support of using a Mutant Registration Act.
 Rebecca Romijn as Mystique: Magneto's loyal second-in-command, who seems completely facile with respect to modern technology. Her powers include altering her shape and voice to mimic any human being, and high agility.
 Ray Park as Toad: A very agile member of the Brotherhood. His powers include a prehensile tongue, a slimy substance that he spits onto others, and enhanced agility.
 Tyler Mane as Sabretooth: A brutal and sadistic member of the Brotherhood. His powers include a ferocious, feline-like nature, enhanced animal-like senses, fangs and healing abilities similar to Wolverine's, and claws extending past the tip of each finger.
 Anna Paquin as Marie / Rogue: A seventeen-year-old girl forced to leave her home in Meridian, Mississippi when she puts her boyfriend into a coma by kissing him. Her powers include absorbing anyone's memories, life force, and – in the case of mutants – powers through physical touch.

Additionally, Shawn Ashmore appeared in a minor role as Bobby Drake / Iceman, a mutant student at Xavier's School for Gifted Youngsters who takes a liking to Rogue. His powers include generating ice.

David Hayter, Stan Lee, and Tom DeSanto make cameo appearances. George Buza, the voice of Beast in X-Men: The Animated Series, appeared as the truck driver who drops Rogue off at the bar at which Wolverine fights. Other cameo appearances include Sumela Kay as Kitty Pryde, Katrina Florece as Jubilee, Donald MacKinnon as a young Piotr Rasputin / Colossus sketching a picture in one scene, and Alexander Burton as John Allerdyce / Pyro. Shawn Roberts also made a cameo appearance in the opening of the film as Rogue's first boyfriend. Kevin Feige initially had a cameo as a Weapon X tech, but his scenes did not make the final cut of the film.

Production

Development

Marvel Comics writers and chief editors Gerry Conway and Roy Thomas wrote an X-Men screenplay in 1984 when Orion Pictures held an option on the film rights, but development stalled when Orion began facing financial troubles. Throughout 1989 and 1990, Stan Lee and Chris Claremont were in discussions with Carolco Pictures for an X-Men film adaptation, with James Cameron as producer and Kathryn Bigelow directing.

A story treatment was written by Bigelow, with Bob Hoskins being considered for Wolverine and Angela Bassett as Storm. The deal fell apart when Stan Lee piqued Cameron's interest in a Spider-Man film, Carolco went bankrupt, and the film rights reverted to Marvel. In December 1992, Marvel discussed selling the property to Columbia Pictures to no avail. Meanwhile, Avi Arad produced the animated X-Men television series for Fox Kids. 20th Century Fox was impressed by the success of the television series, and producer Lauren Shuler Donner purchased the film rights for the property in 1994, bringing Andrew Kevin Walker to write the script.

Walker's draft involved Professor Xavier recruiting Wolverine into the X-Men, which consisted of Cyclops, Jean Grey, Iceman, Beast, and Angel. The Brotherhood of Mutants, which consisted of Magneto, Sabretooth, Toad, Juggernaut and the Blob, try to conquer New York City, while Henry Peter Gyrich and Bolivar Trask attack the X-Men with three  Sentinels. The script focused on the rivalry between Wolverine and Cyclops, as well as the latter's self-doubt as a field leader. Part of the backstory invented for Magneto made him the cause of the Chernobyl disaster. The script also featured the X-Copter and the Danger Room. Walker turned in his second draft in June 1994.

Laeta Kalogridis was brought on for a subsequent rewrite in 1995. An early script kept the idea of Magneto turning Manhattan into a "mutant homeland", while another hinged on a romance between Wolverine and Storm. Michael Chabon pitched a six-page film treatment to Fox in 1996. It focused heavily on character development between Wolverine and Jubilee and included Professor X, Cyclops, Jean Grey, Nightcrawler, Beast, Iceman, and Storm. Under Chabon's plan, the villains would not have been introduced until the second film.

Fox considered Brett Ratner as director (who would later direct X-Men: The Last Stand) and offered the position to Robert Rodriguez, but he turned it down. After the commercial success of Mortal Kombat in the United States, Paul W. S. Anderson was offered the position but turned it down, wanting to shift away from making another PG-13-rated film in favour of making an R-rated horror film, Event Horizon. Following the release of The Usual Suspects, Bryan Singer was looking to do a science fiction film and Fox offered him Alien Resurrection, but producer Tom DeSanto felt he would be more appropriate for X-Men. Singer was hesitant to direct a comic book film, but changed his mind after DeSanto presented the themes of prejudice in the comic that resonated with Singer.

In August 1996, Ed Solomon began work on the script. By December 1996, Singer was in the director's position, while Solomon completed a rewrite that month. Solomon's hiring was publicly revealed in April 1997, and Singer went on to film Apt Pupil. Fox then announced a Christmas 1998 release date. John Logan and James Schamus provided script revisions, with the latter focusing solely on fleshing out the characters. In late 1997, the budget was projected at $60million. In 1998, Claremont returned to Marvel and, seeing how Fox was still struggling with the script, sent them a four-page-long memo where he explained the core concepts and what differentiated the X-Men from other superheroes. In late 1998, Singer and DeSanto sent a treatment to Fox, which they believed was "perfect" because it took "seriously" the themes and the intent of the Xavier and Magneto comparisons to Martin Luther King Jr. and Malcolm X, unlike the other scripts. They made Rogue an important character because Singer recognized that her mutation, which renders her unable to touch anyone, was the most symbolic of alienation. Singer merged attributes of Kitty Pryde and Jubilee into the film's depiction of Rogue. Magneto's plot to mutate the world leaders into accepting his people is reminiscent of how Constantine I's conversion to Christianity ended the persecution of early Christians in the Roman Empire; the analogy was emphasized in a deleted scene in which Storm teaches history. Senator Kelly's claim that he has a list of mutants living in the United States recalls Joseph McCarthy's similar claim regarding communists.

After the disastrous reception of Batman & Robin in 1997, the release of Blade convinced some film studios that a Marvel character "could carry on" a movie. Fox, who had set the budget at $75million, rejected the treatment, which they estimated would have cost $5million more. Beast, Nightcrawler, Pyro, and the Danger Room had to be deleted before the studio greenlighted X-Men. Fox head Bill Mechanic argued that this would enhance the story, and Singer concurred that removing the Danger Room allowed him to focus on other scenes he preferred. Elements of Beast, particularly his medical expertise, were transferred to Jean Grey. In mid-1998, Singer and DeSanto brought Christopher McQuarrie from The Usual Suspects and together they did another rewrite. McQuarrie was initially slated to work on the script for only three weeks but had not yet delivered his draft by October 1998. Joss Whedon was brought in during production to rewrite the last act. Whedon was highly critical of the script and instead performed a "major overhaul". Whedon's draft featured the Danger Room and concluded with Jean Grey dressed as the Phoenix. According to Entertainment Weekly, this screenplay was rejected because of its "quick-witted pop culture-referencing tone", and the finished film contained only two dialogue exchanges that Whedon had contributed. Whedon also claimed to have been invited to the table read, completely unaware that his script had been thrown out.

Actor and producer David Hayter, who at the time was working as Singer's assistant, was brought in for rewrites due to his extensive knowledge of the original comics. Hayter took great pride in retaining much of the core elements from the source material, such as Wolverine's Canadian background, as the studio wanted to make him American. He received solo screenplay credit from the Writers Guild of America, while Singer and DeSanto were given story credit. The WGA offered McQuarrie a credit, but he voluntarily took his name off when the final version was more in line with Hayter's script than his. In July 2020, The Hollywood Reporter revealed that McQuarrie and Solomon both removed their names from the film due to the studio's "tortuous process". Solomon would later express regret towards removing his name. Hayter claims that 55 percent of his script ended up in the finished film, while other insiders claim that the majority of what is onscreen was written by McQuarrie and Solomon with only small contributions from Hayter.

Casting
Glenn Danzig was invited by 20th Century Fox to audition for the role of Wolverine in 1995, as his height and build closely resemble that of the film's protagonist, as described in the original comic books. However, he declined due to scheduling conflicts with his band. With Singer taking over as director, Russell Crowe was the first choice to play Wolverine, but he turned it down, instead recommending his friend, actor Hugh Jackman, for the part. Jackman was an unknown actor at the time, while a number of more established actors offered their services for the role. Singer brought Viggo Mortensen to view storyboards, but Mortensen's son was vocal about the character's imposing appearance. Mortensen was also apprehensive of signing on for multiple films. Dougray Scott was cast as Wolverine in a multi-film deal but was forced to back out due to scheduling conflicts with Mission: Impossible 2 in early October 1999 and sustaining injuries in a motorbike accident. Jackman was then cast three weeks into filming, based on a successful audition.

Patrick Stewart was first approached by Singer to play Xavier on the set of Conspiracy Theory (1997), which was directed by X-Men executive producer Richard Donner. Michael Jackson actively campaigned for the role of Xavier but was never seriously considered by the studio. Jim Caviezel was originally cast as Cyclops but backed out due to scheduling conflicts with Frequency. James Marsden was unfamiliar with his character, but he soon became accustomed after reading various comic books. Marsden modeled his performance similar to a Boy Scout. Anna Paquin dropped out of the lead role in Tart in favor of X-Men. Rachael Leigh Cook was considered for the role of Rogue. Cook later admitted that she regretted her decision to turn the role down. Singer and Hayter originally offered the role of Jean Grey to Charlize Theron but she turned it down. Singer cast Ian McKellen, who had acted in his previous film, Apt Pupil. McKellen responded to the gay allegory of the film, "the allegory of the mutants as outsiders, disenfranchised and alone and coming to all of that at puberty when their difference manifests", Singer explained. "Ian is an activist and he really responded to the potential of that allegory."

Filming
The original start date was mid-1999, with the release date set for Christmas 2000, but Fox moved X-Men to June. Steven Spielberg had been scheduled to film Minority Report for release in June 2000, but he had chosen to film A.I. Artificial Intelligence, and Fox needed a film to fill the void. This meant that Singer had to finish X-Men six months ahead of schedule, although filming had been pushed back. The release date was then moved to July 14.

Filming took place from September 22, 1999, to March 3, 2000, in Toronto and in Hamilton, Ontario. Locations included Central Commerce Collegiate, Distillery District and Canadian Warplane Heritage Museum. Casa Loma, Roy Thomson Hall and Metro Hall were used for X-Mansion interiors, while Parkwood Estate (located in Oshawa, east of Toronto) was chosen for exteriors. Spencer Smith Park (in Burlington, Ontario) doubled for Liberty Island. Post-production was hectic, with Shuler Donner saying that "we had to lock picture and score and edit, sometimes at the same time".

During production, Singer would allegedly arrive late and experience mood swings and "explosive" tantrums. At the time, Singer claimed to be taking medication for back pain. Cast and crew members found Singer's drug use too "problematic". Kevin Feige, the film's associate producer, was flown on-set to ensure that Singer was kept in line. Singer was also accused of giving small roles to younger actors and minors in exchange for sex. A source for Pyro actor Alex Burton says Burton was told the role was created for him by Singer and Marc Collins-Rector. Burton was also flown from Los Angeles to Toronto for filming, an unusual occurrence for an actor with a minor role. Several sources close to The Hollywood Reporter claimed that story meetings were "unprofessional, even by eccentric auteur standards", with Singer allegedly bringing "young guys", who were not involved with the project, to the meetings.

Design and effects
The filmmakers decided not to replicate the X-Men costumes as seen in the comic book. Stan Lee and Chris Claremont supported this decision. Claremont joked, "you can do that on a drawing, but when you put it on people it's disturbing!" Producer/co-writer Tom DeSanto had been supportive of using the blue and yellow color scheme of the comics, but came to conclude that they would not work onscreen. To acknowledge the fan complaints, Singer added Cyclops' line "What would you prefer, yellow spandex?"—when Wolverine complains about wearing their uniforms—during filming. Singer noted that durable black leather made more sense for the X-Men to wear as protective clothing, and Shuler Donner added that the costumes helped them "blend into the night".

Oakley, Inc. provided the red-lensed glasses worn by Cyclops, a customized version of the company's own X-Metal Juliet. Wolverine's claws required no cast of Hugh Jackman's hands, and were built so he could easily put them on and take them off for safety reasons. Production had insisted that they be attached at all times under a full prosthetic sleeve but designer Gordon Smith refused to do it. Production also insisted on real metal blades, which Smith also refused to do, making injection-moulded plaster blades instead. Hundreds of pairs were built for Jackman and his stunt doubles.

Rebecca Romijn wore 110 individual silicone prosthetics on her body to portray Mystique; only the edges were glued, the rest were self-sticking. The prosthetics were built flat and wrapped her body. They were internally colored with food coloring and needed additional makeup or paint. The original agreed-to and tested design was to color her skin with cosmetic-grade food coloring as well, but at the last minute Bryan Singer insisted on painting her skin to look opaque, as in the comic book, which added six hours to the time needed to apply Romijn's makeup, making the ordeal very difficult for her. There were also no facilities provided to exhaust paint fumes, during one of Canada's colder winters. Romijn reflected, "I had almost no contact with the rest of the cast; it was like I was making a different movie from everyone else. It was hell."

In the late 1990s, computer-generated imagery was becoming more commonly used. Singer visited the sets of Star Wars: Episode I – The Phantom Menace and Titanic to understand practical and digital effects. Filming had started without a special effects company hired. Digital Domain, Cinesite, Kleiser-Walczak Construction Co., Hammerhead Production, Matte World Digital, CORE and POP were all hired in December 1999. Visual effects supervisor Mike Fink admitted to have been dissatisfied with his work on X-Men in 2003, despite nearly being nominated for an Academy Award.

Digital Domain's technical director Sean C. Cunningham and lead compositor Claas Henke morphed Bruce Davison into a liquid figure for Kelly's mutation scene. Cunningham said, "There were many digital layers: water without refraction, water with murkiness, skin with and without highlights, skin with goo in it. When rendered together, it took 39 hours per frame." They considered showing Kelly's internal organs during the transformation, "but that seemed too gruesome", according to Cunningham.

Music
Singer approached John Williams to compose the film score, but Williams turned down the offer because of scheduling conflicts. Then Singer set on his usual composer, John Ottman. However, once Fox pushed X-Men from December to July, Ottman's commitment to direct Urban Legends: Final Cut made him unable to work with Singer. Michael Kamen was eventually hired. Given the film was only completed shortly before its premiere, Kamen wrote the score to the finished scenes, which were sent to him just as work was done on them. Singer asked him not to use any songs in the soundtrack as he "didn't want to date the movie". Due to Kamen's unfamiliarity with the comics, he only tried to "represent Bryan Singer's filmic tone that he's made, for a comic book, a quite serious movie, which is about the capacity of humanity to categorize people by race, religion or type, and prejudice people against them based on their innate characteristics". Character-specific themes were written to "identify these characters, as you go through the film, because they're not always clear". For instance, Mystique's motif, focused on the cello as Kamen found it "a very erotic-sounding instrument", played in the soundtrack as she was disguised as Wolverine. Due to time restrictions, the producers scrapped their original plan to record the score in London and did it in Los Angeles.

Kamen's first draft of the score had been described as having an abundance of themes and rich orchestrations. During early recording sessions, producer Lauren Shuler Donner expressed her dissatisfaction with Kamen's music and forced him to rewrite the entire score by using fewer themes and more electronic elements.

La-La Land Records, 20th Century Studios, and Universal Music Special Markets released a 2-CD expanded and remastered release of the X-Men: Original Motion Picture Soundtrack titled: X-Men: Expanded Original Soundtrack, was released on May 11, 2021.

Release

Marketing
Fox aired a special entitled Mutant Watch to promote the movie that partially includes in universe scenes of a senate hearing featuring Senator Robert Kelly. This featurette was included as a bonus feature on some of the video releases. On June 1, 2000, Marvel published a comic book prequel to X-Men, entitled X-Men: Beginnings, revealing the backstories of Magneto, Rogue and Wolverine. There was also a comic book adaptation based on the film. A console video game, X-Men: Mutant Academy, was released on July 6, 2000, to take advantage of the film's release, featuring costumes and other materials from the film.

Theatrical
X-Men had its premiere at Ellis Island on July 12, 2000, two days before a wide opening in 3,025 theaters in North America. It would also debut in Australia that weekend to take advantage of the school holidays, while most other territories would get the film in August. Marvel Studios was depending on X-Mens success to ignite other franchise properties (Spider-Man, Fantastic Four, Hulk, and Daredevil).

Home media
X-Men was originally released on VHS and DVD on November 21, 2000, to take advantage of Thanksgiving in the United States. In its initial home video weekend, the film earned $60million in rentals and direct sales alongside Gladiator, making them earn more than all films in theaters outside from leader How the Grinch Stole Christmas. X-Men finished 2000 as the seventh highest-grossing home release of the year with $141million, with 78% being earned through sales. A new two-disc DVD was released three years later on February 11, 2003 in anticipation to the theatrical release of sequel X2, titled X-Men 1.5. It includes the theatrical version of the film along with the option to add deleted scenes and several new additional features. This THX certified DVD release also features audio commentary, sneak peeks for Daredevil and X2, a DTS 5.1 audio track, enhanced viewing mode and behind-the-scenes footage. The first disc has animated menus with four multi-colored orbs and the second disc has two separated sections, which are X-Men 2 and Evolution X.

X-Men was released on Blu-ray in April 2009, with bonus features reproduced from the X-Men 1.5 DVD release. Unlike the US edition, the UK release of the Blu-ray includes a picture-in-picture mode called "BonusView" and an in-feature photo gallery.

X-Men is included in the 4K Ultra HD Blu-ray set X-Men: 3-Film Collection, which was released on September 25, 2018.

Reception

Box office
In North America, X-Men opened on Friday, July 14, 2000, and made $21.4million on its opening day. This made it the third-highest opening day of any film, behind Star Wars: Episode I – The Phantom Menace and The Lost World: Jurassic Park. It also had the third-highest Friday gross, just after the latter film and Toy Story 2. The film earned $57.5million in its opening weekend, averaging $18,000 per theater, and having the highest-grossing opening weekend for a superhero film (surpassing Batman Forevers $52.8million), a non-sequel and a July release (surpassing Men in Blacks $51.1million). At the time of its release, X-Men had the sixth biggest opening of all time and marked the first time in history that three pictures had consecutive opening weekends above $40million in North America, after The Perfect Storms $41.3million and Scary Movies $42.3million. Moreover, it had the second largest opening weekend of that year, behind Mission: Impossible 2. During its second weekend, the film was overtaken by What Lies Beneath, but made a total of $23.5million.

X-Men grossed $157.3million in the United States and Canada and $139million in other territories for a worldwide total of $296.3million, against a production budget of $75million, becoming the eighth-highest-grossing film of 2000 domestically and ninth worldwide. The success of X-Men started a reemergence for the comic book and superhero film genre.

Critical response
The site's critical consensus reads: "Faithful to the comics and filled with action, X-Men brings a crowded slate of classic Marvel characters to the screen with a talented ensemble cast and surprisingly sharp narrative focus." Metacritic assigned the film a weighted average score of 64 out of 100 based on 33 critics, indicating "generally favorable reviews". Audiences surveyed by CinemaScore gave the film an average grade of "A−" on an A+ to F scale.

Kenneth Turan found "so much is happening you feel the immediate need of a sequel just as a reward for absorbing it all. While X-Men doesn't take your breath away wire-to-wire the way The Matrix did, it's an accomplished piece of work with considerable pulp watchability to it." ReelReviews.net's James Berardinelli, an X-Men comic book fan, believed, "the film is effectively paced with a good balance of exposition, character development, and special effects-enhanced action. Neither the plot nor the character relationships are difficult to follow, and the movie avoids the trap of spending too much time explaining things that don't need to be explained. X-Men fandom is likely to be divided over whether the picture is a success or a failure". Desson Thomson of The Washington Post commented, "[T]he movie's enjoyable on the surface, but I suspect many people, even die-hards, will be less enthusiastic about what lies, or doesn't, underneath".

Roger Ebert of the Chicago Sun-Times said he "started out liking this movie, while waiting for something really interesting to happen. When nothing did, I still didn't dislike it; I assume the X-Men will further develop their personalities if there is a sequel, and maybe find time to get involved in a story. No doubt fans of the comics will understand subtle allusions and fine points of behavior; they should linger in the lobby after each screening to answer questions." He also gave it a "thumbs down" on Ebert & Roeper. Peter Travers of Rolling Stone noted, "Since it's Wolverine's movie, any X-Men or Women who don't hinge directly on his story get short shrift. As Storm, Halle Berry can do neat tricks with weather, but her role is gone with the wind. It sucks that Stewart and McKellen, two superb actors, are underused."

Awards

X-Men was nominated for the Hugo Award for Best Dramatic Presentation, but lost to Crouching Tiger, Hidden Dragon. The film was also successful at the 27th Saturn Awards where it won the categories for Best Science Fiction Film, Director (Bryan Singer), Actor (Hugh Jackman), Supporting Actress (Rebecca Romijn), Writing (David Hayter), and Costumes. Nominations included Best Supporting Actor (Patrick Stewart), Performance by a Younger Actor (Anna Paquin), Special Effects, and Make-up. Singer also won the Empire Award for Best Director.

Sequel

After the film's critical and financial success, a series of films followed, starting with X2 (2003).

References

External links

 Official website
 
 
 
 

2000 films
2000 science fiction action films
2000s adventure films
2000s superhero films
20th Century Fox films
Superhero adventure films
X-Men (film series)
American action films
Bad Hat Harry Productions films
Films about the aftermath of the Holocaust
Films about shapeshifting
Films directed by Bryan Singer
Films produced by Lauren Shuler Donner
Films produced by Ralph Winter
Films scored by Michael Kamen
Films set in 1944
Films set in the 2000s
Films set in Canada
Films set in Africa
Films set in Poland
Films set in Mississippi
Films set in New York City
Films set in Washington, D.C.
Films set in Westchester County, New York
Films shot in Hamilton, Ontario
Films shot in Toronto
Films with screenplays by David Hayter
Statue of Liberty in fiction
2000s English-language films
2000s American films
Live-action films based on Marvel Comics